The letter yogh (ȝogh) was used in Middle English and Older Scots, representing y and various velar phonemes. It was derived from the Insular form of the letter g.

In Middle English writing, tailed z came to be indistinguishable from yogh. 

In Middle Scots, the character yogh became confused with a cursive z and the early Scots printers often used z when yogh was not available in their fonts. Consequently, some Modern Scots words have a z in place of a yogh—the common surname Menzies was originally written Menȝies (pronounced mingis).

Yogh is shaped similarly to the Arabic numeral 3, which is sometimes substituted for the character in online reference works. There is some confusion about the letter in the literature, as the English language was far from standardised at the time. Capital  is represented in Unicode by code point , and lower case   by code point .

Pronunciation 

In Middle Scots, it represented the sound  in the clusters ,  and  written l and n. Yogh was generally used for  rather than y.

In medieval Cornish manuscripts, yogh was used to represent the voiced dental fricative , as in its , now written , pronounced .

History

Old English

Following palatalization, both gyfu and Latin g in Old English expressed the  sound before front vowels. For example, "year" was written as gear, even though the word had never had a g sound (deriving from Proto-Germanic *jērą).

With the re-introduced possibility of a  sound before front vowels, notably in the form of loanwords from the Old Norse (such as gere from Norse gervi, Modern English gear), this orthographical state of affairs became a source for confusion, and a distinction of "real g" from "palatalized g" became desirable.

In the Old English period, ᵹ was simply the way Latin g was written in the Insular script introduced at the Christianisation of England by the Hiberno-Scottish mission. It only came to be used as a letter distinct from g in the Middle English period, where it evolved in appearance into ȝ, now considered a separate character.

Middle English
In the 14th century, the digraph gh arose as an alternative to yogh for /x/, and eventually overtook yogh in popularity; still, the variety of pronunciations persisted, as evidenced by cough, taught, and though. The process of replacing the yogh with gh was slow, and was not completed until the arrival of printing presses (which lacked yogh) in England around the end of the fifteenth century.

The medieval author Orm used this letter in three ways when writing Early Middle English. By itself, it represented , so he used this letter for the y in "yet". Doubled, it represented , so he ended his spelling of "may" with two yoghs. Finally, the digraph of yogh followed by an h represented .

In the late Middle English period, yogh was no longer used:  came to be spelled night.

Scots
In words of French and Gaelic origin, the Early Scots palatal consonant  had become  or in some cases , and the palatal consonant  had become  by the Middle Scots period. The pronunciation of MacKenzie (and its variant spellings) (from Scottish Gaelic  ), originally pronounced  in Scots, shows where yogh became z. Menzies Campbell is another example.

After the development of printing
In Middle Scots orthography, the use of yogh became confused with a cursive z and the early Scots printers often used z when yogh was not available in their fonts.

The yogh glyph can be found in surnames that start with a Y in Scotland and Ireland; for example the surname Yeoman, which would have been spelled . Sometimes, the yogh would be replaced by the letter z, because the shape of the yogh was identical to some forms of handwritten z.

In Unicode 1.0, the character yogh was mistakenly unified with the quite different character ezh (Ʒ ʒ), and yogh itself was not added to Unicode until version 3.0.

Examples of Middle English words containing a yogh 
These are examples of Middle English words that contain the letter yogh in their spellings.

  ("night")
  ("eye")
  ("yea")
  ("hallowed")
  ("gate")
  (past tense of "go", which in ME is often "yede")
 ,  (past participles of "yield" and "yean")
  ("harboured")
  ("ear")

  ("hied, hastened")
  ("gift")
  ("if")
  ("yes")
  ("yesterday")
  ("yester-")
  ("yet")
  ("give" or "if")
  ("wrought")

Placenames
 Barncailzie Wood – a Wood in Galloway that lends its name to a former hunting lodge;
 Ben Chonzie – a mountain in Perthshire;
 Branziert – a suburb of Killearn in Stirlingshire;
 The Branziet – pronounced bringit (IPA ), a farm and settlement near Bardowie, East Dunbartonshire that lends its name to the Branziet Burn and Branziet Bridge;
 Bunzion – pronounced bunion (IPA ), Lower and Upper Bunzion are farms in the Parish of Cults, Fife;
 Cadzow – the former name of the town of Hamilton, South Lanarkshire; the word Cadzow continues in modern use in many street names and other names, e.g. Cadzow Castle, Kilncadzow;
 Calzeat – an obsolete place name from the Parish of Broughton, Glenholm and Kilbucho in Peebleshire which, since 1971, has leant its name to textile manufacturer Calzeat and Company Limited;
 Calziebohalzie – a former farmstead in Stirlingshire with a rare instance of a word containing two yoghs, from Gaelic Coille Buachaille;
 Cockenzie – pronounced cockennie (IPA ), from the  meaning "cove of Kenneth", a town in East Lothian;
 Colzium Estate – now pronounced as written, a historic estate and mansion house built on the banks of the Colzium Burn near Kilsyth;
 Corriemulzie – a river in Sutherland that lends its name to the Corriemulzie Estate;
 Crailzie Hill – a hill in the Scottish Borders;
 Culzean – pronounced culain (IPA ), a historic castle in Ayrshire run by the National trust for Scotland;
 Dalmunzie – now pronounced as written, a historic castle in Perthshire now repurposed as a hotel;
 Dalzellowlie or Dallzellowlie – a colliery located between Maybole and Girvan in South Ayrshire;
 Drumelzier – pronounced drumellier (IPA ), a village in the Tweed Valley that shares its name with Drumelzier Castle, Drumelzier Kirk, the Drumelzier Burn and Drumelzier Law;
 Drunzie and Drunzie Feus - two adjacent settlements near Glenfarg in Perth and Kinross;
 Easter Dalziel – pronounced deeyel (IPA ) from Gaelic Dail Gheal meaning "white field";
 Edzell – now pronounced as written, a village in Angus and the nearby settlement Edzell Woods;
 Finzean – pronounced fingen (IPA ), an area in rural Aberdeenshire;
 Funzie Girt – pronounced funyie girt (IPA ), a historic dividing wall on Fetlar;
 Gartwhinzean – a historic settlement near Crook of Devon in Perth and Kinross;
 Glazert Water – a tributary of the River Kelvin which lends its name to a Country House Hotel and two streets in Lennoxtown;
 Glazert Burn – a tributary of the River Irvine in North Ayrshire;
 Glenrazie – a small settlement near Newton Stewart, Dumfries & Galloway which lends its name to Glenrazie Woods to the north;
 Glenzier – pronounced glinger (IPA ), a village in Dumfries & Galloway which lends its name to Glenzierfoot and the Glenzier Burn;
 Kailzie Gardens – a historic walled garden near Kirkburn, Scottish Borders;
 Kilchenzie or Kilkenzie – a small settlement on the Kintyre peninsula, from Choinnich, the genitive of Coinneach "Kenneth";
 Kilhenzie – a small settlement in South Ayrshire, also from Choinnich;
 Kirkgunzeon – pronounced kirkgunion (IPA ), a village in Dumfries and Galloway;
 Lenzie – now pronounced as written (IPA ), but previously lenyie (IPA ), a village near Glasgow;
 Lochranza – pronounced as written, but found as Loch Ranga as recently as the late 19th century, a village on the Isle of Arran;
 Menzion – a village in the Borders;
 Menzieshill – an area of Dundee;
 Monzie – pronounced money (IPA ), from the Gaelic Moighidh, "a level tract", a parish in Perthshire near Crieff which lends its name to Monzie Castle and the Falls of Monzie;
 Monzievaird – with competing etymologies but supposed to be from the Gaelic Maghbhard, "plain of the bards", a place in Perthshire — the site of the Massacre of Monzievaird and which lends its name to Loch Monzievaird;
 Moonzie – a parish in Fife generally supposed to be from Gaelic and meaning "hill of the deer";
 Portencalzie – a small settlement near Kirkcolm on the Rhins of Galloway;
 Pitcalzean – an obscure archaeological enclosure near the village of Nigg, Highland that lends its name to nearby Pitcalzean House;
 Queenzieburn – pronounced queenieburn (IPA ), a village in Lanarkshire;
 Ruchazie – now pronounced as written (IPA ), a district of Glasgow;
 Terringzean Castle – pronounced tringan (IPA ) but with a variety of recorded spellings, a castle in East Ayrshire;
 Ulzieside – an estate and farm near Sanquhar in Dumfries and Galloway;
 Zell – archaic spelling of the island of Yell;
 Zetland – the name for Shetland until the 1970s – Shetland postcodes begin with the letters ZE.

Surnames
Cadzow – see placename;
Dalziel – pronounced deeyel (IPA ) or dehyell, from Gaelic Dail Gheal; also spelled Dalyell and Dalzell;
Gilzean – pronounced gilain, a variant of Maclean, from Gaelic MacGilleEathain. However, many now pronounce the 'z', including footballer Alan Gilzean;
Layamon – now pronounced as written although frequently rendered as Laȝamon up to the early 1900s in literary referents;
McFadzean – pronounced macfadyen (IPA ), scotticised version of the Gaelic surname MacPhaidin also found, primarily in Ireland, anglicised as MacFadden;
MacKenzie – now pronounced as written, though as late as 1946 George Black recorded the original form pronounced makenyie (IPA ), from the Gaelic MacCoinnich as standard;
Winzet – pronounced winyet (IPA ).
See also:
Gilhaize – an invented surname used for the eponymous protagonist of John Galt's Ringan Gilhaize

Miscellaneous nouns
 Assoilzie – pronounced with a silent z – in Scots law: finding for (ruling in favour of) the defender in a civil matter;
 Brulzie – with a variety of spellings including bruilzie and broolzie – a commotion or noisy quarrel – possibly related to Brulyie to broil;
 Capercailzie – the Scots spelling of capercaillie (IPA ) from the Gaelic capall-coille meaning "forest horse";
 Gaberlunzie – most correctly pronounced gaberlunyie (IPA ) but now often pronounced as written, a licensed beggar;
 Spulzie — pronounced spooly with a variety of spellings including spuilzie and spulyie, both the taking of movable goods and the term for a process of restitution for such crimes;
 Tailzie – pronounced  in Scots law: a defunct since 2000 term for an entailed estate/interest in one;
 Tuilzie – now standardised to Tulyie a struggle or fight, from the Old French 'toeillier' meaning to strive, dispute or struggle.

In Egyptology
A Unicode-based transliteration system adopted by the Institut Français d'Archéologie Orientale suggested the use of the yogh ȝ character as the transliteration of the Ancient Egyptian "aleph" glyph: A

Since Unicode 5.1, it has been assigned its own codepoints (uppercase U+A722 Ꜣ LATIN CAPITAL LETTER EGYPTOLOGICAL ALEF, lowercase U+A723 ꜣ LATIN SMALL LETTER EGYPTOLOGICAL ALEF); a fallback is the numeral 3.

See also 
 Old English Latin alphabet

References

External links

 
 .

Middle English
G – Yogh
Yogh
Yogh